William Kearney may refer to:

William Kearney (judge) (born 1935), Australian judge
William Kearney (footballer) (1895–1986), English  footballer
William Kearney (hurler) (born 1989), Irish hurler
William Kearney, namesake of Kearney, Ontario
William Kearney, a character in the Western 3 Godfathers